ARJ may refer to:

 ARJ, a compressed file format
 ARJ, the IATA code for Arso Airport, Indonesia
 The Comac ARJ21 Advanced Regional Jet